Raffael Korte (born 29 August 1990) is a German former professional footballer who played as a midfielder.

Career
Korte was born in Speyer. He joined 2. Bundesliga club Eintracht Braunschweig in 2011 from Oberliga Südwest side TuS Mechtersheim. After two seasons in Braunschweig, he was loaned to 1. FC Saarbrücken in the 3. Liga for the 2013–14 season. After the 2014–15 2. Bundesliga season, Korte joined Union Berlin on a free transfer.

Korte retired in summer 2020 after recurring knee problems which required four surgeries.

Personal life
Korte is the identical twin brother of Gianluca Korte, also a professional footballer.

References

External links
 
 

1990 births
Living people
People from Speyer
Footballers from Rhineland-Palatinate
Identical twins
Twin sportspeople
German twins
Association football midfielders
German footballers
2. Bundesliga players
3. Liga players
Eintracht Braunschweig players
Eintracht Braunschweig II players
1. FC Saarbrücken players
1. FC Union Berlin players
SV Waldhof Mannheim players